Anurag Agrawal may refer to:

 Anurag Agrawal (ecologist) (born 1972), American professor of ecology
 Anurag Agrawal (medical scientist) (born 1972), Indian pulmonologist